Kyle Hilbert (born ) is a Republican member of the Oklahoma House of Representatives, representing the 29th district and the current speaker pro tempore of the Oklahoma House of Representatives.

Early life
Kyle Hilbert attended Oklahoma State University and earned a Bachelor's Degree in Agribusiness. While at college, Hilbert served as Student Government Association President.

Legislative Career
He was initially elected in November 2016.

58th Oklahoma Legislature
He was elected as the speaker pro tempore of the Oklahoma House of Representatives for the second session on February 8, 2022. The position was vacated by Terry O'Donnell after his indictment in a tax agency scandal.

References

1990s births
21st-century American politicians
Living people
Oklahoma Republicans
Year of birth missing (living people)